The Woman is a 2011 American horror film directed by Lucky McKee, adapted by McKee and Jack Ketchum from McKee and Ketchum's novel of the same name. It is a sequel to the 2009 film Offspring. The film stars Pollyanna McIntosh, Angela Bettis, Sean Bridgers, Lauren Ashley Carter, Carlee Baker, and Alexa Marcigliano, and introduces Zach Rand and Shyla Molhusen.

The film was released as part of the Bloody Disgusting Selects line.

In 2019, McIntosh wrote and directed a sequel titled Darlin'.

Plot
After the events in Maine, an unidentified feral woman is the last remaining member of a cannibalistic tribe that has roamed the Northeast coast for decades. 

Chris Cleek is a Country lawyer, who lives with his wife Belle, their two daughters Peggy, and Darlin', and their son, Brian. While out hunting, Chris sees the woman, who is bathing and fishing on a creek. The next day, Chris returns with a net in an effort to capture her. Once captured, Chris returns home with her and restrains her in a cellar, then directs his family to participate in "civilizing" her. Over the following days, the Cleek family is revealed to be a very dysfunctional. Chris's first attempt to approach the woman results in her biting off and eating his ring finger. Chris orchestrates a violent series of civilizing measures toward the woman.

Chris bathes the woman with boiling water and a high-pressure power washer, causing her extreme pain, and is afterward clothed in a dress Belle sewed. Later that night, Chris rapes the woman while Brian secretly observes through a hole. The next day, Brian also violates the woman with a pair of pliers but is caught by Peggy.

After a series of verbal and physical abuse conducted by both Chris and Brian towards the woman and the family, Belle announces her intention to leave Chris with Peggy and Darlin. In response, Chris knocks Belle unconscious.

Peggy's geometry teacher Ms. Genevieve Raton, visits the Cleek residence with the suspicion that Peggy might be pregnant. Chris angrily assumes that Ms. Raton is accusing him of rape and incest, then proceeds to knocks her unconscious in response. Chris and Brian tie her up and take her to the barn where he keeps the family dogs. Peggy tries to intervene but becomes a victim of Chris' vicious verbal assault. In the barn, Ms. Raton is attacked by eyeless girl named "Socket", the Cleek's secret third daughter who behaves like the dogs. Socket kills and consume Ms. Raton, as Chris and Brian watch.

Peggy releases the imprisoned woman from the cellar. Belle, having regained consciousness, is attacked and killed by the woman. The woman then proceeds to kill Brian with a saw. Chris tries to shoot the woman but is overpowered, the woman then tears his heart out, and consumes it. Afterward, the woman makes her way to the Cleeks' house where she places her hand on Peggy's uterus, confirming that Peggy really is pregnant with Chris' child. The woman then leaves with Darlin' and Socket, making their way to the woods. Peggy watches as they leave and she slowly starts following at a distance.

Cast
 Pollyanna McIntosh as the Woman, the survivor of a tribe of cannibals.
 Sean Bridgers as Chris Cleek, a country lawyer.
 Angela Bettis as Belle Cleek, the wife of Chris Cleek.
 Lauren Ashley Carter as Peggy Cleek, the oldest daughter of Chris Cleek and Belle Cleek.
 Carlee Baker as Ms. Raton, the teacher of Peggy Cleek.
 Alexa Marcigliano as Socket Cleek, an eyeless girl, daughter of Chris Cleek and Belle Cleek.
 Zach Rand as Brian Cleek, the sadistic son of Chris Cleek and Belle Cleek.
 Shyla Molhusen as Darlin' Cleek, the youngest daughter of Chris Cleek and Belle Cleek.

Reception

Critical reception for The Woman has been positive. , the film holds a 73% approval rating on Rotten Tomatoes, based on 51 reviews with an average rating of 6.40 out of 10. The website's critics consensus reads: "Strange, audacious, and aggressive, The Woman is an uneven horror flick that game viewers with a wildly bloody finale."

Awards and nominations
 Octopus d’Or at the Strasbourg European Fantastic Film Festival, for the best international feature film
 Audience Award for the best international feature film at the Strasbourg European Fantastic Film Festival
 The Siren; International Award at the Lund Fantastic Film Festival

Sequel
In 2019, a standalone sequel called Darlin' was released which is also Pollyanna McIntosh's directing debut as it tells about a now-feral Darlin' getting taken in by a Catholic boarding school as part of the Woman's secret plans.

Notes

References

External links
 
 
 

2011 films
2011 horror films
American horror films
Films based on American horror novels
Films shot in Massachusetts
Incest in film
2011 independent films
American rape and revenge films
American sequel films
Films directed by Lucky McKee
Films about cannibalism
2010s English-language films
2010s American films